Antonio Rubio Fernández (born August 20, 1949) is a retired boxer from Spain, who twice represented his native country during the 1970s at the Summer Olympics. He reached the quarterfinals in 1972 (Munich). Four years later in Montreal, Quebec, Canada, Rubio was stopped in his first bout in the second round of the lightweight division (– 60 kg) by Cuba's Reinaldo Valiente.

1976 Olympic record
Below is the record of Antonio Rubio Fernández, a Spanish lightweight boxer who competed in the 1976 Montreal Olympics:

 Round of 64: bye:
 Round of 32: lost to Reinaldo Valiente (Cuba) referee stopped contest in the second round

References
 Spanish Olympic Committee

1949 births
Living people
Lightweight boxers
Boxers at the 1972 Summer Olympics
Boxers at the 1976 Summer Olympics
Olympic boxers of Spain
Spanish male boxers